The 2017–18 season was Videoton FC's 49th competitive season, 18th consecutive season in the OTP Bank Liga and 76th year in existence as a football club. The club won its third league title this season, two points ahead of closest challenger Ferencváros.

First team squad

Transfers

Summer

In:

Out:

Statistics

Appearances and goals
Last updated on 12 August 2017.

|}

Top scorers
Includes all competitive matches. The list is sorted by shirt number when total goals are equal.

Last updated on 12 August 2017

Disciplinary record
Includes all competitive matches. Players with 1 card or more included only.

Last updated on 12 August 2017

Overall
{|class="wikitable"
|-
|Games played || 11 (5 OTP Bank Liga, 6 Europa League and 0 Hungarian Cup)
|-
|Games won || 6 (3 OTP Bank Liga, 3 Europa League and 0 Hungarian Cup)
|-
|Games drawn || 4 (2 OTP Bank Liga, 2 Europa League and 0 Hungarian Cup)
|-
|Games lost || 1 (0 OTP Bank Liga, 1 Europa League and 0 Hungarian Cup)
|-
|Goals scored || 20
|-
|Goals conceded || 10
|-
|Goal difference || +10
|-
|Yellow cards || 32
|-
|Red cards || 1
|-
|rowspan="1"|Worst discipline ||  Anel Hadžić (5 , 0 )
|-
|rowspan="1"|Best result || 3–0 (A) v Bordeaux - Europa League - 27-07-2017
|-
|rowspan="1"|Worst result || 1–2 (A) v Balzan - Europa League - 04-07-2017
|-
|rowspan="5"|Most appearances ||  Danko Lazović (11 appearances)
|-
|  Loïc Nego (11 appearances)
|-
|  Stopira (11 appearances)
|-
|  Ádám Kovácsik (11 appearances)
|-
|  Asmir Suljić (11 appearances)
|-
|rowspan="1"|Top scorer ||  Marko Šćepović (8 goals)
|-
|Points || 22/33 (66.67%)
|-

Nemzeti Bajnokság I

Matches

League table

Results summary

Results by round

Magyar Kupa

Europa League

The First and Second Qualifying Round draws took place at UEFA headquarters in Nyon, Switzerland on 19 June 2017.

References

External links
 Official Website
 UEFA
 fixtures and results

Fehérvár FC seasons
Hungarian football clubs 2017–18 season